Adam Hughes Putnam (born July 31, 1974) is an American politician who served as the 11th Commissioner of Agriculture of Florida from 2011 to 2019. A member of the Republican Party, he previously served in the U.S. House of Representatives for five terms, representing the Central Florida-based 12th congressional district. He chaired the House Republican Conference from 2007 to 2009.

In May 2017, he announced he was running for Governor of Florida in the 2018 election. Putnam was initially considered the frontrunner for the Republican nomination, but lost the primary to U.S. Representative Ron DeSantis after President Donald Trump came out in open support of DeSantis. DeSantis went on to win the general election against Tallahassee Mayor and Democratic nominee Andrew Gillum. On March 13, 2019, it was announced that he would become the next CEO of Ducks Unlimited, starting June 30, 2019, after the retirement of Dale Hall.

Early life, education, and early career
 
Putnam was born in Bartow, Florida, the son of Sarah Elizabeth (née Hughes) and William Dudley Putnam II. He graduated from Bartow High School and attended the University of Florida, graduating with a Bachelor of Science in food and resource economics.

In 1996, Putnam was elected to the Florida House of Representatives, representing parts of Polk County. At 22 years old, he was the youngest person ever elected to the Florida Legislature. He was reelected to a second term in 1998. While in the state house, he served as chair of the Agriculture Committee.

U.S. House of Representatives

In 2000, Putnam ran for the U.S. House seat being vacated by retiring Congressman Charles Canady. The district, numbered the 12th, included all of Putnam's home constituency as well as other areas of Polk County and rural Central Florida. He faced no opposition in the Republican primary, and defeated Democrat Mike Stedem in the general election, 57 to 43%. Taking office when he was 26 years old, Putnam was the youngest member of Congress from 2001 to 2005. Putnam was reelected in 2002 to a redistricted seat that included most of Polk County as well as parts of neighboring Hillsborough and Osceola Counties. He was reelected three more times after that, serving a total of ten years in Congress.

Committee assignments
 Committee on Financial Services
 Subcommittee on Capital Markets, Insurance, and Government Sponsored Enterprises
 Subcommittee on Housing and Community Opportunity

Tenure
On October 10, 2002, Putnam voted in favor of authorizing the invasion of Iraq.

In February 2006, Putnam became a member of the House leadership, assuming the role of chairman of the House Republican Policy Committee, the fifth-ranking Republican leadership position in the House. In November 2006, Putnam was elected by his colleagues as House Republican Conference Chairman, the third-highest ranking position. Following House Republican losses in the 2008 general election, he resigned his post as Conference Chairman. In 2010 The Florida Independent reported that Putnam had earmarked $100,000 for an abscission chemical used in citrus harvesting that The Florida Independent said would benefit his family's citrus business.

Putnam was a signatory to the Taxpayer Protection Pledge.  The American Conservative Union gave him a 91% evaluation.

Gonzales' ouster
After the numerous calls by Democrats, including Rep. Nancy Pelosi (D-CA), Speaker of the House and Senate Majority Leader Sen. Harry Reid (D-NV), Putnam became the top Republican in either house to call for the ouster of then U.S. Attorney General Alberto Gonzales. "For the good of the nation, I think it is time for fresh leadership at the Department of Justice", Putnam said. This was met with surprise by many Republicans, who were remaining silent on the Gonzales issue. However, Putnam mentioned that there remained severe discontent within the GOP circle over Gonzales and as the Chairman of the House Republican Conference, he thought that it was important to send this message out.

Commissioner of Agriculture and Consumer Services

In February 2009, Putnam declared himself a candidate for Florida Commissioner of Agriculture and Consumer Services in the 2010 election and that he would not seek a sixth term in Congress. Putnam won the election over Democratic opponent Scott Maddox with 56% of the vote. He was reelected in 2014.

As head of the Florida Department of Agriculture and Consumer Services, Putnam was responsible for issuing concealed weapons permits after conducting background checks on applicants. An investigation by the Office of Inspector General found that from February 2016 until May 2017 the department stopped conducting national background checks on applicants for concealed weapons permits, because a worker could not log into an FBI database. More than 100,000 concealed carry permits were issued during this period without full screening. Putnam later said that 365 applicants should have been further backgrounded, and that 291 permits ended up being revoked for noncriminal disqualifying factors (drug abuse, mental illness, fugitives). Putnam pointed out that concealed carry permits do not allow gun purchases, which require a background check at the time of purchase. Florida Governor Rick Scott said that the incident was "disturbing" and "concerning" adding, "People need to do their jobs. This is public safety."  Additional failures in conducting proper reviews of gun permit applications were reported in a 2012 report of the inspector general, including the issuance of gun licenses to felons, which occurred during the first years of Putnam's tenure, although certain instances occurred before Putnam's tenure.

In response to the 2013 series Worst Charities in America by the Tampa Bay Times and the Center for Investigative Reporting (CIR)—the result of a year-long joint investigation, in 2014 Putnam crafted CS/SB 638 and CS/HB 629—legislation that was intended to crack down on "fraudulent and deceptive organizations" to prevent them from misusing charitable contributions donated by residents of Florida. The legislation "had passed two of their three referenced committees" by March 2014.

Gubernatorial campaign
In May 2017, Putnam announced his campaign for the governorship of Florida in the 2018 election to succeed term-limited Republican Rick Scott. He was one of eight candidates running for the Republican nomination.

Putnam placed second in the primary election, which was won by U.S. Representative Ron DeSantis. However, as of April 2018, Putnam's campaign had acquired $19.2 million in campaign contributions, far more than any other candidate. His PAC, Florida Grown, has received large contributions from The Walt Disney Company ($824,442), Publix ($736,000), Florida Power and Light ($587,060) and U.S. Sugar ($560,000). The donations from Publix to Putnam drew public protest, including a die-in at a Publix supermarket, resulting from Putnam's claim of being a "proud NRA sell-out".

Electoral history

References

External links
 
 
 "Opie's All Grown Up Now", U.S. News & World Report, December 3, 2006
 "Opie?" , National Review, July 30, 2007

|-

|-

|-

|-

|-

|-

|-

|-

1974 births
21st-century American politicians
American Episcopalians
Bartow High School alumni
Florida Commissioners of Agriculture
Living people
Republican Party members of the Florida House of Representatives
People from Bartow, Florida
Republican Party members of the United States House of Representatives from Florida
University of Florida College of Agricultural and Life Sciences alumni